Sievers is a surname. Notable people with the surname include:

 Any member of the Sievers family
 Anthony John "Tony" Sievers, Australian politician
 Bryan Sievers, American politician
 Christian Sievers (born 1969), German journalist and television presenter
 Eduard Sievers (1850-1932), German philologist
 Eduard Wilhelm Sievers (1820-1894), German Shakespeare scholar
 Emanuel von Sievers (1817-1909), Baltic German aristocrat, senator and grand master of the Russian imperial court
 Eric Sievers (born 1957), American professional football player
 Frederick William Sievers (1872-1966), American sculptor
 Henry Sievers (1874 -?), American assistant printer, trade union activist and liquor store operator 
 Hugo K. Sievers (1903-1972), Chilean scientist from a Hamburg merchant family
 Jacob von Sievers (1731-1808),  Baltic German statesman from the Sievers family
 Jan-André Sievers (born 1987), German footballer
 Jan-Ole Sievers (born 1995), German football goalkeeper
 Johann August Carl Sievers (1762–1795), German-born botanist 
 Jörg Sievers (born 1965), German footballer
 Karl-Heinz Sievers (born 1942), German long-distance runner
 Kay Sievers, German software engineer and developer of the udev device manager of Linux
 Leroy Sievers (1955-2008), American journalist
 Marie von Sievers (1867-1948), he second wife of Rudolf Steiner and one of his closest colleagues
 Mark Sievers (born 1968), American convicted murderer
 Max Sievers (1887-1944), chairman of the German Freethinkers' League
 Morris Sievers (1912-1968), Australian cricketer
 Peter von Sievers (1674-1740), Russian admiral
 Ralf Sievers (born 1961), former German football player
 Roy Sievers (1926–2017), American baseball player
 Sampson Sievers (1900-1979), Russian Orthodox Christian elder
 Teresa Sievers (1968–2015), American doctor and murder victim
 Thadeus von Sievers(1853-?),  Baltic German general of the Imperial Russian Army
 Todd Sievers (born 1980), former American football placekicker 
 Walther Sievers, German Commander of the III./Infanterie-Regiment 415, Knight's Cross of the Iron Cross received on 19 December 1942
 Wilhelm Sievers (1860-1921), German geographer and geologist
 Wolfgang Sievers (1913-2007), Australian photographer
 Wolfram Sievers (1905-1948), German Holocaust perpetrator and manager of the Ahnenerbe, executed for war crimes

See also
 Seevers, a surname
 Siever, a surname
 Siewierz, a town in the Silesian Voivodeship in Poland
 Sivers (disambiguation)

de:Sievers